David Aldus (born 18 September 1941) is a Welsh painter. Much of his work depicts landscape scenes but he is equally known for his maritime scenes having sold one to the President of Malta Dr Ugo Mifsud Bonnici. The painting "A Tribute to the People of Malta" sold for £10,000. The President of Malta gave the painting to the people of Malta and is in the Museum of Malta in Valletta where it is on display.

Personal life 
Aldus was born and spent much of his life in the Garrison town of Brecon. His father, John Macdonald Aldus, was a Company Sergeant Major in the South Wales Borderers, as was his father, killed in action in the Khyber pass. His grandfather on his maternal side, William Godfrey was a miner down the Blaenavon pit.

Art 
Aldus developed a realist style, influenced in part by the French artist Jules Bastien-Lepage and the colourful primitivism of Cézanne.

His painting "A Tribute to the people of Malta" resides in the Museum at Valletta, many of landscapes are views of his Buckinghamshire/Oxfordshire and its surrounding countryside. He was a finalist in the Garrick/Milne Prize exhibition held at London's Christies. He exhibited at the Lambeth Palace under the auspices of the Royal Society of Marine Artists. Other Aldus accolades include full membership election in 1994 to UA United Artists.

In that same year, he was awarded the Acrylic Painting prize at Westminster Central Hall, London. In 1995 David Aldus won the Oil paintings prize at UA annual exhibition.

In 1995, he had work displayed at the Royal Institute of Oil Painters (R.O.I.) in their annual exhibition held at the Mall Galleries, London.

Aldus has exhibited with the Royal Society of British Artists (R.B.A.) He also had work displayed at the Royal Society of Marine Artists (R.S.M.A.) at their annual exhibition. In November the Royal Society of Marine Artists asked him to display his work at Lambeth Palace where again he sold all his paintings.

In December 1995, he had his work selected by the Discerning eye exhibition. Judge Edward Lucie-Smith and another Art critic chose his work for the same exhibition. One of his Landscape paintings was purchased by the town of Brecon and presented to their twin town of Saline in the U.S.A.

Aldus completed commissions for actor David Jason and ice skater Christopher Dean. Aldus was also commissioned to paint Britain's first black female mayor Lydia Simmons in Slough 1984. Aldus has also done work for Freddie Starr, the Duchess of Devonshire, Lord Carrington and rock star Jamiroquai.

External links 
 The Discerning Eye - home page
 davidaldus.com

20th-century Welsh painters
20th-century Welsh male artists
21st-century Welsh painters
21st-century Welsh male artists
1941 births
Living people
Welsh male painters